Bladen Lakes State Forest (BLSF) is a North Carolina state forest near Elizabethtown, North Carolina, USA. It is managed by the North Carolina Forest Service. Bladen Lakes comprises three parcels of land and has a total of eight compartments. Adjoining the forest are Turnbull Creek Educational State Forest, Jones Lake State Park and Singletary Lake State Park. The vast majority of the forest is in the Game Lands Program, which is administered by the North Carolina Wildlife Resources Commission. There are several safety zones where hunting is prohibited or restricted (archery zones, hunting areas for disabled persons and still hunting only areas).

BLSF is a working forest, which means it is actively managed and creates its own income. Yearly revenues are generated through timber sales, pine straw sales and cooking of charcoal. It is an active partner in the Forest Stewardship Program contributing significantly to the regions clean water and air, protection of the soil, wildlife habitat, recreational resources and timber supplies.

The general public is invited to visit the forest and enjoy the scenery and multitude of landscape features, like the Carolina bays, pocosins, sand ridges, river bottoms and swamps. Horseback riding and camping at designated places is welcomed. Street legal vehicles can be used on the 100+ miles of roads and trails as long as these are not behind closed gates. There is a long list of other activities people can do at BLSF. Some use the lack of lights in the forest for star gazing at night. Several universities, community colleges and other scientific organizations have study sites within the forest boundaries. Several agencies and the military use the forest as training ground. Many activities other than hunting require a Special Use Permit, which can be obtained from the office free of charge during regular office hours.

External links
 
 North Carolina Forest Service
 North Carolina Wildlife Resources Commission
 Video about the making of Charcoal at BLSF
 Restoring the Long Leaf Pine at Bladen Lakes State Forest with former Supervisor Michael Chesnutt

North Carolina state forests
Protected areas of Bladen County, North Carolina